I Turn to You is the first solo studio album by American country music artist Richie McDonald, following his departure from the band Lonestar in 2007. It was released on June 3, 2008 by Stroudavarious Records. The album peaked at number 6 on the Billboard Top Christian Albums chart.

Track listing
"Carry the Cross" (Richie McDonald, Frank J. Myers, Greg Rausch) – 4:21
"I Turn to You" (Jeff Kohen, Myers) – 3:35
"Stay with Me Lord" (Myers, Rausch) – 3:41
"He's Alive" (McDonald, Myers) – 3:41
"Faith" (Jason Eustice, McDonald, Myers) – 3:59
"Handle with Prayer" (Steve Diamond, McDonald) – 3:55
"What Would He Do" (McDonald, Myers, Rausch) – 4:00
"Walls" (Gary Baker, Matt Johnson, Karen Kingsbury, McDonald) – 3:56
"Blessed Are the Hands That Give" (Baker, Johnson, McDonald) – 3:51
"Hey God" (Tommy Lee James, McDonald) – 3:41
acoustic

Personnel

 Tim Akers - Hammond B-3 organ, piano, strings
 Walt Aldridge - acoustic guitar
 Bruce Bouton - steel guitar
 Spady Brannan - bass guitar
 Steve Brewster - drums
 Jim "Moose" Brown - Hammond B-3 organ, piano, strings
 Mickey Buckins - percussion
 Robert Collier - electric guitar
 Eric Darken - percussion
 Billy Davis - background vocals
 Chip Davis - background vocals
 Tommy Harden - drums
 Matt Johnson - background vocals
 Jeff King - electric guitar
 Troy Lancaster - electric guitar
 Paul Leim - drums
 Kevin "Swine" Grantt - bass guitar
 Richie McDonald - lead vocals
 Jerry McPherson - electric guitar
 Greg Morrow - drums
 Jimmy Nichols - Hammond B-3 organ, piano, strings
 Billy Panda - acoustic guitar
 Gary Prim - piano
 Jimmie Lee Sloas - bass guitar
 Doug Stokes - background vocals
 Ilya Toshinsky - acoustic guitar
 Wanda Vick - fiddle
 Jerry Williams - string arrangements, conductor
 John Willis - acoustic guitar

Chart performance

Awards

The album was nominated for a Dove Award for Country Album of the Year at the 40th GMA Dove Awards.

References

2008 debut albums
Richie McDonald albums
R&J Records albums